Perth Free Presbyterian Church is located in Perth, Perth and Kinross, Scotland. Standing on Pomarium Street, in the southwestern corner of the city centre, it was completed in 1939. It is now a Category C listed building. The church was designed by local architect William Erskine Thomson.

A "distinctive, little-altered, well-detailed church," it is notable for its crowstepped gables and steep pedimented dormerheads.

The church and adjoining flat were originally built as a hall and caretaker's flat for the Forteviot Charitable Trust in what was then a run-down area of Perth.

See also

List of listed buildings in Perth, Scotland

References 

Category C listed buildings in Perth and Kinross
Listed churches in Scotland
Free Presbyterian
1939 establishments in Scotland
Listed buildings in Perth, Scotland